The Harwood Street Historic District is a historic commercial district and Dallas Landmark District on the east end of downtown Dallas, Texas lying in parts of the City Center District, Main Street District and Farmers Market District. The locally protected district generally encompasses structures in the blocks fronting Harwood Street from Pacific Avenue to Canton Street.

The district represents a cross-section of Dallas commercial architecture from the 1880s to the 1950s. Styles range from Italianate to Beaux-Arts, Sullivanesque, Neo-classical, Renaissance Revival, Art Moderne, Art Deco and Modern.

History
At the turn of the twentieth century, Harwood Street carried merchants and bankers from their mansions in The Cedars to their offices downtown and back home again at night. In the 1920s it was scene shop row, home to the city's vaudeville suppliers.

In 1990 the area was designated a local historic district. Most of the area became part of the larger Dallas Downtown Historic District in 2009.

Contributing Structures
The following structures are considered contributing properties of the Harwood Historic District and were constructed over a period of six decades. Many of them have been re-purposed for residential or commercial uses with few alterations to their historical appearance. Others await restoration and are currently vacant.

See also

List of Dallas Landmarks

References

External links

Harwood Historic District
Map of the District

History of Dallas
Historic districts in Texas
Dallas Landmarks